The office of Minister of State without Portfolio, an office often known as constitution minister, is a ministerial role in the Government of the United Kingdom. The officeholder currently supports the office of Chancellor of the Duchy of Lancaster with public appointments and government communications. The post is currently vacant after the resignation of Gavin Williamson.

List of ministers

References
{{reflist|
{{refs=

}}
}}

Ministerial offices in the United Kingdom
Cabinet Office (United Kingdom)